Eleuterio Zapanta or Little Dado, (January 1, 1916 – July 7, 1965), was a flyweight boxer from the Philippines, who became World bantamweight champion in 1940 and World flyweight champion in 1941.

Professional career
Little Dado was one of the top Flyweight and Bantamweights in the world during the late 1930s and early 1940s. From 1938 until the end of his career in 1943, Dado was ranked in the top five in the Flyweight division by The Ring magazine—attaining the #1 overall rating in 1939, during a time when the title was deemed vacant by The Ring.

During his prime, Dado claimed both the World Flyweight and Bantamweight Titles, attaining recognition in California. Dado expressed a desire to win the Featherweight Title, hoping to become the second boxer to ever hold three different world titles simultaneously.

In 1996 The Ring rated Little Dado as the fifth greatest Filipino boxer in history.

See also
 List of flyweight boxing champions

External links
 

1916 births
1965 deaths
Flyweight boxers
World boxing champions
Filipino male boxers
Boxers from Negros Occidental